John William Xeres-Burgos Joseph Jr., also known as Johnny Midnight (March 31, 1941 – October 6, 2014) was a Filipino radio and television broadcaster. He was a pioneer reporter of Radyo Patrol in the 1960s. He was awarded with the Presidential Humanitarian Award of the First Order by then President Ferdinand Marcos due to his work in helping the victims of the 1968 Casiguran earthquake in Binondo, Manila. He died due to prostate cancer on October 6, 2014.

Filmography

Radio
Midnight Connection (DZRJ, DZBB)
Metro Patrol Midnight Connection (2014, DWIZ)

Television
Midnight Connection, host (RJTV 29)
RJTV Interactive News, anchor (RJTV 29)
Radyo Bandido sa Telebisyon, host (NBN 4)

References

1941 births
2014 deaths
Filipino radio personalities
Filipino television personalities
People from Bacolod
Deaths from prostate cancer
Deaths from cancer in the Philippines